Pasquale Scotti (born 8 September 1958 in Casoria) is an Italian criminal and boss of the Camorra—a Mafia-type organisation in Naples and Campania—involved in the Nuova Camorra Organizzata (NCO), headed by Raffaele Cutolo.

Camorra boss
He was described as a smooth and ruthless personality and one of the most able of the lieutenants of Cutolo together with Vincenzo Casillo. Scotti and Casillo—who had close ties to the secret services—mediated between Cutolo and the regional leaders of the Christian Democrat party (DC), the military secret service and the Red Brigades to obtain the release of the politician Ciro Cirillo, who had been kidnapped in April 1981. Scotti also administered the assets of the NCO investing it in Italy and abroad.

Casillo was killed by a bomb in his car in January 1983, presumably to cover the secret negotiations by DC politicians to free Cirillo contravening to official policy of the Italian government to not negotiate with so-called terrorists. Scotti was behind the killing of Casillo's mistress because she knew too much about the dealings of his erstwhile ally.

Arrest and escape
After the transfer of Cutolo to the prison island Asinara and the wave of arrest against the NCO in June 1983, Scotti tried to rearrange the organisation. He was arrested on 17 December 1983 in his fiefdom Caivano where he controlled the rackets and trafficking in drugs, smuggled cigarettes and arms. His arrest involved a shoot out with the police in which Scotti was injured. During detention, fearing a vendetta of rival Camorristi, he decided to become a pentito and collaborate with the authorities revealing different aspects of NCO. On Christmas Eve of 1984, he escaped from the hospital of Caserta where he had been hospitalized for a wound to the hand.

Fugitive and final arrest
Since 1985, he has been on the "most wanted list" of the Italian ministry of the Interior for murder and concealment of corpse and other crimes. On 17 January 1990 an international arrest warrant was issued against him, to be arrested for extradition.

In January 2005 he received a life sentence for a series of 26 murders in 1982-83 during the Camorra war between the NCO and the Nuova Famiglia. In October 2011, while Scotti had been on the run for nearly 27 years, the Italian police issued a new photofit on the basis of a mug-shot from the 1980s.

There has been speculation that Scotti is no longer alive. He either might have been killed by rival factions in the Camorra, or because he had turned state witness, or because he knew too much about involvement of politicians and secret services in the release of the kidnapped Cirillo. According to a 'Ndrangheta boss turned state witness, Franco Pino, Scotti died in 1984. He was finally arrested by the Interpol office in Brazil and the Brazilian Federal Police in Recife (Brazil) on 26 May 2015, after about 30 years on the run and then extradited to Italy on 10 March 2016. In July the same year Pasquale Scotti became a pentito and started cooperating with Italian authorities.

See also
List of fugitives from justice who disappeared

References

1958 births
Camorristi
Living people
Nuova Camorra Organizzata
People from the Province of Naples